(–)-2β-(3-Methylisoxazol-5-yl)-3β-(p-tolyl)tropane (RTI-4229-171) is a phenyltropane derivative which acts as a selective dopamine reuptake inhibitor, with a relatively slow onset of action and short duration of effects found in animal studies. However, other studies have shown it to have the most pronounced effects in terms of speed of onset and rate of stimulation among many differing phenyltropanes.

See also
 List of phenyltropanes
 RTI-126
 O-4210

References 

Tropanes
RTI compounds
Dopamine reuptake inhibitors